Omm ol Hejar (also Romanized as Omm ol Ḩejār; also known as Omm ol Ḩamām, Omm ol Ḩejā, Omm ol Ḩiyār, Omm ol Jabbār, Umm al Haiyar, and Umrul Hayur) is a village in Darkhoveyn Rural District, in the Central District of Shadegan County, Khuzestan Province, Iran. At the 2006 census, its population was 665, in 88 families.

References 

Populated places in Shadegan County